= Chairman Chiang =

Chairman Chiang may refer to:

- Chiang Kai-shek (1887–1975), former Chairman of the Nationalist government of China
- Chiang Ching-kuo (1910–1988), former Chairman of the Kuomintang (Nationalist Party)
